Manuel de Velasco y Tejada commanded the Spanish fleet during the Battle of Vigo Bay (1702), which occurred during the War of Spanish Succession.

in 1708 he bought the title of Governor of the Río de la Plata for 3,000 pesos but was apprehended there and sent to Spain, with all his belongings taken.

Velasco, Manuel de
18th-century Spanish people
Governors of the Río de la Plata